Barney Cutbill (born 21 March 1973) was an English cricketer. He was a right-handed batsman and right-arm medium-pace bowler who played for Cheshire. He was born in Halifax.

Cutbill, who played for Cheshire in the Minor Counties Championship between 2002 and 2006, made two List A appearances for the side, during the C&G Trophy in August and September 2002. He did not bat in either match, though he bowled 19 overs, conceding 99 runs.

1973 births
Living people
English cricketers
Cheshire cricketers
Cricketers from Halifax, West Yorkshire